Liu Yu-chan (born 20 December 1975 in Taiwan) is a Taiwanese baseball player who played for the Brother Elephants of Chinese Professional Baseball League. He was a starting pitcher for the Elephants. He played for the Chinatrust Whales from 1999 to 2008. In the end of 2008, the Chinatrust Whales has disbanded, he was picked up by Brother Elephants in the second round of the redistribution draft.

Career statistics

See also
 Chinese Professional Baseball League
 Chinatrust Brothers
 Chinatrust Whales

References

External links
 

1975 births
Living people
Baseball pitchers
Brother Elephants players
Chinatrust Whales players
People from Taitung County
Taiwanese baseball players